Justin Shenkarow (born October 17, 1980) is an American actor, producer, director and writer, best known for his roles of Matthew Brock in Picket Fences, Simon Holmes in Eerie, Indiana, and the voice of Harold Berman from the Nickelodeon animated series, Hey Arnold!.

Life and career
Shenkarow has starred in television and film for over 30 years. He received three Young Artist Award nominations for his work as an actor on Picket Fences. He has starred in television shows including Eerie, Indiana, Home Improvement, The Fresh Prince of Bel-Air, Strong Medicine, and Boston Public.

Shenkarow's production company, Shake That Fro Productions, has produced three short films  in 2006 which he wrote, produced, directed and starred in, Decoy, The Best Christmas Ever and Tears. In 2005 he appeared in two films, House of the Dead 2 and Comedy Hell co-starring Eric Roberts.

In 2004, he was elected to the Screen Actors Board and was recently elected to chair the Young Performer's Committee. In 2008, Shenkarow appeared on an episode of TLC's Flip That House where he flipped a home in Sherman Oaks, California. In 2010, he was on an episode of The Millionaire Matchmaker looking for love.

Filmography

Film

Television 

Sources:

Short films

Video games

References

External links

Living people
American film producers
American male film actors
American male television actors
American male voice actors
Jewish American male actors
Stanford University alumni
1980 births
Place of birth missing (living people)
20th-century American male actors
21st-century American male actors
21st-century American Jews